Aethalida dohertyi is a moth of the family Erebidae. It was described by George Hampson, a British entomologist, in 1901. It is found on the Sangir Islands.

References

Moths described in 1901
Spilosomina
Moths of Indonesia